This is a list of people who have permanently adopted a vegetarian diet at some point during their life. Former vegetarians and those whose status is disputed are not included on this list.

The following list does not include vegetarians who are identified as vegan—those who do not consume produce that utilise animal derivatives such as eggs and dairy—who are listed separately at List of vegans.


See also
List of vegans
List of fictional vegetarian characters
List of pescetarians

Notes

References

Vegetarians